Josef Augustin (born 18 May 1942) is a Czech chess International Master (1976), Czechoslovak Chess Championship winner (1965).

Biography
In the 1960s and 1970s Josef Augustin was one of the leading Czechoslovak chess players. He repeatedly competed in the Czechoslovak Chess Championship finals, where winning three medals: gold (Pardubice, 1965), silver (Ostrava, 1976) and bronze (Brno, 1975). In 1976, he was awarded the FIDE International Master (IM) title.

Josef Augustin played for Czechoslovakia in the Chess Olympiad:
 In 1968, at first reserve board in the 18th Chess Olympiad in Lugano (+1, =2, -2).

Josef Augustin played for Czechoslovakia in the European Team Chess Championship:
 In 1977, at fourth board in the 6th European Team Chess Championship in Moscow (+0, =5, -2).

Josef Augustin played for Czechoslovakia in the World Student Team Chess Championships:
 In 1960, at second board in the 7th World Student Team Chess Championship in Leningrad (+4, =3, -0) and won team and individual gold medals,
 In 1961, at first reserve board in the 8th World Student Team Chess Championship in Helsinki (+3, =4, -1),
 In 1963, at first reserve board in the 10th World Student Team Chess Championship in Budva (+1, =2, -3).

References

External links

Josef Augustin chess games at 365chess.com

1942 births
Living people
People from Kyjov
Czechoslovak chess players
Czech chess players
Chess International Masters
Chess Olympiad competitors